Gonyosoma jansenii, commonly known as the Sulawesi black-tailed ratsnake or Celebes ratsnake, is a species of snake in the family Colubridae. It is endemic to the Indonesian island of Sulawesi.

References 

Colubrids
Snakes of Southeast Asia
Endemic fauna of Indonesia
Reptiles of Sulawesi
Taxa named by Pieter Bleeker
Reptiles described in 1858